Andrey Leonidovich Kostin (born September 21, 1956) is a Russian banker who is chairman of the VTB Management board since June 10, 2002.

Education and career 
In 1973, Kostin began studies at Moscow State University, graduating in 1979 with a degree in political economy. He subsequently worked at the USSR Ministry of Foreign Affairs. From that year, until 1982 he was an employee of the USSR Consulate General in Sydney, Australia. From 1982 to 1985, he was  Secretary of the European Department of the USSR Ministry of Foreign Affairs. In 1985, he became an employee of the USSR Embassy in Great Britain working on economic issues with the KGB spy Alexander Lebedev, where he remained until 1990. From then to 1992, he was First Secretary, Advisor to the European Department of the USSR Ministry of Foreign Affairs.

He is the president of the Financial and Banking Council of the Commonwealth of Independent States (CIS-FBC) from 2006 to 2017, being succeeded by Vadim Kumin.

In May 2017, Kostin suggested the Washington elite was purposefully disrupting the presidency of Donald Trump by spreading false accusations about his ties to Russia. In January 2018, Kostin said that additional sanctions against Russian individuals or entities would be an "economic war".

He is on the supervisory board of Post Bank.

Criticism and corruption allegations

Blocking of publications by Roskomnadzor 
In the interests of VTB, and by a court decision, Roskomnadzor blocked about 1000 publications.

On December 2, 2019, FBK’s Alexei Navalny released an investigation about Kostin's relationship with Naila Asker-zade on YouTube. In this video Alexei Navalny accused Kostin of making gifts to journalist Nailya Asker-zade (use of a business jet, yacht, house in the cottage village, two apartments, one of them directly from VTB, second from Kirill Zimarin, the head of a subsidiary of VTB in Cyprus) with proof from her Instagram account. Kostin, according to Navalny in his video clip, uses money belonging to the bank, 60.9% of which is state-owned, to buy luxurious real estate for his beloved. According to The Bell said that there is a link between VTB and the business jet, but not with the yacht, and that it is impossible to draw a conclusion about the owners of the plane and yacht, as well as who paid for the journalist's travels. On December 25, 2019, Kostin said that he would think about what actions to take about the investigation, and refused to comment.

Sanctions
In April 2018, the United States imposed sanctions on him and 23 other Russian nationals.

On March 15, 2019, Canada imposed sanctions on a number of individuals, including Kostin, over violations of Ukraine's sovereignty and territorial integrity.

By decree of Ukrainian President Vladimir Zelensky is under Ukraine's sanctions since June 24, 2021.

February 23, 2022, after Russia's recognition of the DPR and LPR, included in the sanctions list of all countries of the European Union.

Following Russia's 2022 invasion of Ukraine, the UK imposed sanctions on Kostin which involved freezing his assets and a travel ban. After the invasion, Switzerland, Japan, New Zealand and Australia also imposed sanctions.

Sanctioned by New Zealand in relation to the 2022 Russian invasion of Ukraine.

Personal life 
According to official data, Kostin is married, has children and a grandson. Nailya Asker-Zade, a reporter on the state-run channel Russia-24, is his long-time girlfriend.

His eldest son Andrey (1978–2011), worked as Deputy Chairman of the Board of Deutsche Bank in Russia. He died on July 2, 2011 during a trip on an ATV while on vacation in the Yaroslavl Region.

References

External links 
 

1956 births
Living people
Businesspeople from Moscow
Russian bankers
Moscow State University alumni
Full Cavaliers of the Order "For Merit to the Fatherland"
Recipients of the Order of Honour (Russia)
Knights of the Ordre national du Mérite
Financial University under the Government of the Russian Federation alumni
Russian individuals subject to the U.S. Department of the Treasury sanctions
Russian individuals subject to European Union sanctions
Russian individuals subject to United Kingdom sanctions